"Arise, Russian People!" Is a patriotic song from the Soviet film "Alexander Nevsky" (1938) directed by Sergei Eisenstein. The music is composed by Sergei Prokofiev, with lyricist Vladimir Lugovskoy. 

"Arise, Russian people!" is also the fourth movement of the Prokofiev cantata "Alexander Nevsky" (adapted from the film score in 1939), which has seven parts: "Russia under the Mongolian Yoke," "Song about Alexander Nevsky," "Crusaders in Pskov," "Arise, Russian People!" "Battle of the Ice," "Field of the Dead," and "Alexander's Entry into Pskov." In the primary theme of "Arise, Russian People!" Prokofiev makes use of ancient Russian motifs and evokes sounds of traditional Russian musical instruments.

Original 
Вставайте, люди русские
На славный бой, на смертный бой!
Вставайте, люди вольные
За нашу землю честную!

Живым бойцам - почёт и честь
А мёртвым - слава вечная!
За отчий дом, за Русский Край
Вставайте, люди русские!

Вставайте, люди русские
На славный бой, на смертный бой!
Вставайте, люди вольные
За нашу землю честную!

На Руси родной, на Руси большой
Не бывать врагу!
Поднимайся, встань,
Мать родная, Русь!
На Руси родной, на Руси большой
Не бывать врагу!
Поднимайся, встань,
Мать родная, Русь!

Вставайте, люди русские
На славный бой, на смертный бой!
Вставайте, люди вольные
За нашу землю честную!

Врагам на Русь не хаживать,
Полков на Русь не важивать!
Путей на Русь не видывать,
Полей Руси не таптывать!

Вставайте, люди русские
На славный бой, на смертный бой!
Вставайте, люди вольные
За нашу землю честную!

Translation 
Arise, Russian people,
On a glorious battle, to the death battle!
Arise, free people,
For our honest land!
Honor for alive soldiers
And thank eternal for dead.
For father's house, for the Russian region
Arise, Russian people!
To the native Rus, to the native Rus
Won't come the enemy!
Get up, stand up,
Mother dear, Rus!

Literary translation (Fritz Reiner and Chicago Symphony Orchestra English version)   
Arise to arms, ye Russian folk, 
In battle just, in fight to death. 
Arise ye people free and brave, 
Defend our fair, our native land!
To living warriors high esteem, 
Immortal fame to warriors slain. 
For native home, for Russian soil 
Arise ye people, Russian folk!
Arise to arms, ye Russian folk, 
In battle just, in fight to death. 
Arise ye people free and brave, 
Defend our fair, our native land!
In our Rus great, 
In our native Rus 
No foe shall live. 
Rise to arms, arise, native motherland.
Arise to arms, ye Russian folk, 
In battle just, in fight to death. 
Arise ye people free and brave, 
Defend our fair, our native land!
No foe shall march 'cross Russian land, 
No foreign troops shall Rus raid. 
Unseen the ways to Rus are. 
No foe shall ravage Russian fields.
Arise to arms, ye Russian folk, 
In battle just, in fight to death, 
Arise ye people, free and brave, 
Defend our fair, our native land!

References 

Russian songs